Southern Knights was a comic book created by the husband-and-wife team of Henry and Audrey Vogel. It chronicled the adventures of a superhero team based in Atlanta, Georgia. Initially known as "The Crusaders", they were renamed The Southern Knights with their second issue due to Archie Comics' Red Circle Imprint having their own group called The Mighty Crusaders, though an in-context explanation is proffered in issue #2. Jackson Guice and Chuck Wojtkiewicz both made their comics debut on the series before going on to greater fame with other titles.

Cast

Team members 
Electrode (David Shenk) — The leader of the group, a scientist whose love of comics motivated him to give himself super-powers. Can generate electricity—up to and including lightning bolts—and can fly. He often pressures the team into adopting superhero conventions such as wearing costumes and patrolling the city, but underneath such superficial pretensions, he is genuinely concerned with saving lives.
Connie Ronnin — A former Olympic fencing silver-medalist. She can create a 'psychic sword' which causes people struck by it to react as though it were a real sword, but leaves no lasting damage. Being a projection of psychic energy, her sword is not at all inhibited by armor. Though this is never revealed in the comics, creator Henry Vogel has stated that Connie's sword works through latent telepathic and telekinetic powers.
Kristin Austin — A petite graduate of Clemson University who is strong enough to destroy a tank and tough enough to withstand at least .50 cal. machine gun rounds. Confident, outgoing, flirtatious, and hot-tempered, she becomes enraged by any show of chauvinism. Having had her powers since early childhood, she is comfortable with being superpowered and rarely hesitates to use her strength in public.
Dragon (Moranderin/Mark Dagon) — The last of the dragons (or so he initially believes). After his mate and child were slain by men, he found that he could take on the form of a human male. After having his revenge on the slayer of his family, he wandered the world for a thousand years until meeting up with the Knights. In dragon form he is immensely strong and tough, can fly and breathe fire. In human form he is no tougher or stronger than a normal human. He was eventually featured in his own four-issue limited series, which chronicled several of his adventures from the centuries before the other Southern Knights were born.
Aramis Merrow — A teenage sorcerer from the 17th century who was placed in suspended animation by his parents when their coven was attacked. He was awakened by Kristin while she was exploring the house the team had moved into. His magical powers include flight, scrying, summoning illusions, mystical shields, and bolts of magical energy. His major weakness is trying to adjust to modern-day life. The only non-founding member, he was introduced in issue #5. A running joke of the series is that despite his participating in nearly all of the Knights' missions, often playing the key role to their victories, he is persistently denied membership on the grounds that their work is too dangerous for someone his age. He is finally given official membership in issue #26.

The team's groundskeeper, Bryan Daniels, would sometimes don a high-tech suit of armor, designed by David Shenk, to help them out.

Enemies 
Franklin John Barl - A wealthy socialite, and neighbor to the Knights. After they rescued him, he became their official sponsor, but when he failed to relay crime reports, they publicly humiliated him in retaliation. The most frequently appearing villain of the series, he repeatedly threatens to get the team thrown out of the neighborhood, but this plot thread is never actually developed.
Dread - A sociopath who has the mental power to draw forth a person's deepest fear and make it appear real to the victim.
Viper - A powerful criminal organization led initially by Serpent, then by Zephyr Flint, then by an unidentified man. (Not to be confused with the VIPER from Champions and League of Champions.)
Carl and Larry -  Two hitmen who rely on their wits.
Morrigan - A goddess who draws power from the sacrifice of living creatures. It was a worshipper of Morrigan who slew Dragon's mate.

Publication history
The superteam debuted in The Crusaders #1 (December 1982). The original creative team included three writers: co-creators Henry and Audrey Vogel and co-plotter/letterer David H. Willis. The team was filled out by Jackson Guice on both pencils and inks, though Guice would be penciling only on Southern Knights #2 and gone entirely after that. The series was published quarterly at first by the Guild, a company founded by Willis and Henry Vogel for the sole purpose of publishing the series. Artists came and went in quick succession, but with issue #5 penciler Chuck Wojtkiewicz and inker Steve Kent came on as the steady art team, and sales became exceptionally high for a self-published series. After issue #7, Southern Knights was taken on by Comics Interview (a company which had previously only put out magazines), and following a half-year's hiatus, went bi-monthly. Comics Interview president David Anthony Kraft quickly came up with the idea of using the tagline "The #1 Super Team of the South".

However, the success of the Knights was mixed with creative turnover. Issue #8 was the first to be published by Comics Interview, and the last to feature Audrey Vogel as writer (though several later issues of the series credit her as "story consultant"). According to Henry Vogel, she gradually fell out of writing the series due to exhaustion from working a full-time job. Willis left two issues after, leaving Henry Vogel to write the series by himself. Southern Knights gradually became less oriented on long-term plot threads and character development, and increasingly consisted of short story arcs and single-issue stories. Wojtkiewicz left after issue #11, and with issue #13 Mark Propst began both penciling and inking the Knights. The look he brought to the series broadened the series' readership, and Comics Interview began publishing numerous Southern Knights spin-offs, mostly using reprints. For instance, a "Dread Halloween Special" was actually just a reprint of Southern Knights #14, and a three-issue Aramis limited series was simply a reprinting of select Aramis appearances from issues #5-26, with brief textual segues. The Southern Knights also guest-starred in Aristocratic Xtraterrestrial Time-Traveling Thieves (vol.2) #1.

Propst left the series after issue #19, and from that point on Southern Knights would be drawn only by short-term or fill-in artists. Ultimately the series's popularity faded, and it was canceled with issue #33 (June 1989), though a Christmas issue would be published at the end of the year.

From 1986 to 1989 Comics Interview released a series of collections of the title. Rather than being comic-sized reprints like the soon to be standard trade paperback, these collections were 8 1/2" by 11" and collected fewer issues than a typical trade paperback.

Southern Knights Graphic Novel (1986): Reprints Crusaders #1 & Southern Knights #2

Early Days of the Southern Knights #2 (1986): Reprints issues #3-5

Early Days of the Southern Knights #3 (1986): Reprints issues #6-7

Early Days of the Southern Knights #4 (1987): (titled Origins of the Southern Knights on the cover) Reprints issues #8 and the Southern Knights: Special Report one-shot

Early Days of the Southern Knights #5 (1987): Reprints issues #9-11

Early Days of the Southern Knights #6 (1988): Reprints issues #12-14

Early Days of the Southern Knights #7 (1988): Reprints issues #15-16

Early Days of the Southern Knights #8 (1989): Reprints issues #17-19

In 1992 the series was revived for a crossover with Heroic Publishing's League of Champions (issues #5-8) and Flare (issues #8 and 9), titled "The Morrigan Wars". Parts two and five were published as Southern Knights #35 and 36, and both the Knights themselves and their supporting cast figured prominently throughout the crossover. Though all the installments are credited as being co-written by Vogel, in fact his role was limited to the crossover's basic plot; the scripting and issue-by-issue plotting were done solely by Flare/League of Champions writer/editor Dennis Mallonee. Mallonee gave the series a more character-driven approach, and also introduced a romance between Kristin and Aramis. Propst, having since become regular artist on Flare, inked most of the crossover. Mallonee expressed hope that Heroic would be able to continue the series beyond the crossover, but interest proved insufficient, and Southern Knights #36 is the final issue to date.

In 2010, Heroic reprinted "The Morrigan Wars", with color added, in Champions #47-50 and Flare Adventures #27-28. This was the first time any of the Southern Knights' adventures were published in color.

References

External links
 Southern Knights at the International Catalogue of  Superheroes

American comics titles
Superhero teams
Comics characters introduced in 1983